This page lists public opinion polls in connection with the 2016 Austrian presidential election.

First round

Second round

Second round re-vote

2016
2016 elections in Austria
Presidential elections in Austria